The Chinese Elm cultivar Ulmus parvifolia 'Yarralumla' is a cultivar raised by the Yarralumla Nursery in Canberra, Australia.

Description
'Yarralumla' is distinguished by its broad, weeping habit and smooth decorative trunk. Growing to approximately 15 m by 15 m, its foliage in autumn is bright yellow.

Pests and diseases
The species and its cultivars are highly resistant, but not immune, to Dutch elm disease, and they are unaffected by the elm leaf beetle Xanthogaleruca luteola.

Cultivation
The tree is not known to have been introduced to Europe or North America.

Accessions

Australasia

Waite Arboretum, University of Adelaide, Adelaide, Australia. Acc. nos. 634A, 634B, 634C

Nurseries

Australasia

Metro Trees, Alphington, Victoria, Australia.
Winter Hill Tree Farm, Canyonleigh, New South Wales, Australia
Yarralumla Nursery, Yarralumla, Canberra, Australia.

Notes

Chinese elm cultivar
Ulmus articles missing images
Ulmus